Eriel Sánchez León (born April 12, 1975) in (Fomento, Sancti Spiritus). Is a Cuban baseball catcher for Sancti Spíritus of the Cuban National Series.

Career
Sánchez was part of Cuba's gold medal-winning team at the 2004 Summer Olympics, silver medal winning team at the 2008 Summer Olympics and the second place team at the 2006 World Baseball Classic.

References

External links
 

1975 births
Olympic baseball players of Cuba
Baseball players at the 2004 Summer Olympics
Baseball players at the 2007 Pan American Games
Baseball players at the 2008 Summer Olympics
Olympic silver medalists for Cuba
Olympic gold medalists for Cuba
People from Sancti Spíritus Province
Living people
2006 World Baseball Classic players
Olympic medalists in baseball
2013 World Baseball Classic players
Medalists at the 2008 Summer Olympics
Medalists at the 2004 Summer Olympics
Pan American Games gold medalists for Cuba
Pan American Games medalists in baseball
Central American and Caribbean Games gold medalists for Cuba
Competitors at the 2006 Central American and Caribbean Games
Central American and Caribbean Games medalists in baseball
Medalists at the 2007 Pan American Games